Kojo Adu Asare (born 30 June 1966) is a Ghanaian politician and a former member of parliament for the Adenta constituency in the Greater Accra Region of Ghana.

Early life and education 
Asare hails from Abirim Akuapem in the Eastern Region of Ghana. He is a senior high school leaver.

Career 
Asare is the CEO of the social corporate responsibility movement. He is also the former chief executive officer of Vital Concepts limited, which has branches in Ghana, Sierra Leone And Guinea. He served as a former general deputy secretary of the National Democratic Congress

Personal life 
Asare is a Christian and married with three children.

References 

Living people
1966 births
Government ministers of Ghana
Ghanaian Christians
Ghanaian MPs 2009–2013
National Democratic Congress (Ghana) politicians